The Reversing Falls Bridge is a two-lane bridge crossing the Saint John River at Saint John, New Brunswick, Canada. It carries New Brunswick Route 100 (Bridge Road) across the river and there is no toll for its use.

History
The Reversing Falls rapids are a notoriously dangerous stretch of water passing through a gorge which creates a chasm through the middle of the Saint John metropolitan region.  Prior to construction of the first bridge in 1853, ferries were used to connect both sides of the river in the city.

The first bridge was a suspension bridge, built by Joseph Tomlinson, measured 190 m in span. Its replacement, the current steel arch structure or Saint John Highway Arch Bridge (designed by Philip Louis Pratley), was opened to public use alongside the original in 1915.  Both structures have shared the site of this crossing with the Reversing Falls Railway Bridge since 1885. It is also known as the floating bridge.

Until the 1940s, the Reversing Falls Bridge also carried a streetcar line.

Until 1968, with the opening of a second bridge in Saint John, the Harbour Bridge, the Reversing Falls Bridge was the only link between the city's East and West sides.

Visitors may stop at a public viewing point above the bridge on the west bank of the river, or use a restaurant and gift shop constructed adjacent to its western abutment.

See also 
 List of bridges in Canada

References

Road bridges in New Brunswick
Bridges over the Saint John River (Bay of Fundy)
Transport in Saint John, New Brunswick
Buildings and structures in Saint John, New Brunswick
Arch bridges
Steel bridges in Canada